World Driver Championship is an automobile racing video game. It was developed by Boss Game Studios and published for the Nintendo 64 by Midway Games. It is notable for having especially high quality graphics.

Gameplay
World Driver Championship is a racing game that features ten locations. Most locations feature six tracks (marked "A", "B", and "C"), three of which are in reverse (marked "R" next to "A", "B", and "C"). The exception is Black Forest, which has only four tracks, two of them being in reverse. These are the ten locations: Hawaii; Les Gets, France; Las Vegas, USA; Auckland, New Zealand; Lisbon, Portugal; Rome, Italy; Sydney, Australia; Zurich, Switzerland; Kyoto, Japan; and the Black Forest in Germany.

Development
The game was showcased at E3 1999. One of the last racing simulations to be released for Nintendo 64, this graphically intensive title uses custom microcode optimization and high polygon count modelling. The development team was able to optimize the usage of the various processors within the N64 to allow a great draw distance (reducing the need for fog or pop-up), highly detailed texturing and models, Doppler effect MP3 audio, and advanced lighting and fog effects for realistic weather conditions. Increasingly prevalent toward the latter years of the N64's commercial lifetime, the game has a high resolution 640x480 mode that does not require the add-on N64 RAM Expansion Pak. Additionally, unlike many other games of its type on the platform, the game runs high resolution at a smooth pace.

The soundtrack, consisting of original rock and heavy metal tunes, was composed by musician Zack Ohren.

Reception

Although World Driver Championship received generally positive reviews from critics, it suffered from intense competition at the time. While the game was an improvement in nearly every way compared to Boss's similar earlier effort, Top Gear Rally, it was up against the impressive new Gran Turismo series and other new racers. Complaints included a somewhat unconvincing driving physics model, non-licensed cars, and poor sound effects and music quality. The dislike for the physics model often stems from the beginning cars being difficult to drive and offering a "sloppy" feeling of control. Next Generation praised the game, stating that "Arcade racing fans may find it too tough, but this is a must-buy for anyone who wants a realistic GT racing game."

References

External links

1999 video games
Midway video games
Nintendo 64 games
Nintendo 64-only games
Racing video games
Video games developed in the United States